Lilian Mary Watson (17 September 1857 – 27 May 1918) was an English female tennis player.

Biography
Lilian Watson was born on 17 September 1857 in Harrow, Middlesex, the daughter of a local vicar Henry William and Emily Frances Watson.

In 1884, she and her younger sister Maud played in the first women's competition at the Wimbledon Championships. Both met in the final which Maud won 6–8, 6–3, 6–3 to become Wimbledon's first female champion.

Lilian played at Wimbledon in the following two years. In 1885, she was defeated in the first round by J. Meikle. In the same year, she won the doubles title at the Irish Championships alongside her sister Maud. In her final Wimbledon appearance in 1886 she reached the semifinals in which she was defeated by eventual champion Blanche Bingley.

She died on 27 May 1918, aged 60, at Berkswell.

References

1857 births
1918 deaths
19th-century English people
19th-century female tennis players
English female tennis players
Tennis people from Greater London